Sudan competed in the 2003 All-Africa Games held at the National Stadium in the city of Abuja, Nigeria. The team entered thirteen events and won two bronze medals, both in athletics.

Competitors
Sudan competed in thirteen events, twelve for men and one for women.

Medal summary
The team won two bronze medals and were ranked joint thirty-eighth in the medal table.

Medal table

List of Medalists

Bronze Medal

References

2003 in Sudanese sport
Nations at the 2003 All-Africa Games
2003